David John Goldsmith (born 11 September 1947) is a former English cricketer.  Goldsmith was a right-handed batsman who fielded as a wicket-keeper.  He was born in Romford, Essex.

Goldsmith made his debut for Buckinghamshire in the 1986 Minor Counties Championship against Berkshire.  Goldsmith played Minor counties cricket for Buckinghamshire from 1986 to 1991, which included 34 Minor Counties Championship matches and 11 MCCA Knockout Trophy matches.  In 1987, he made his List A debut against Somerset in the NatWest Trophy.  He played 4 further List A matches for Buckinghamshire, the last coming against Somerset in the 1991 NatWest Trophy.  In his 5 List A matches, he scored 7 runs at a batting average of 2.33, with a high score of 4.

References

External links
David Goldsmith at ESPNcricinfo
David Goldsmith at CricketArchive

1947 births
Living people
People from Romford
English cricketers
Buckinghamshire cricketers
Wicket-keepers